Lapushnik or Lapusnik may refer to:

Lapušnik (Лaпушник), a town in Kosovo
Llapushnik prison camp, in Lapušnik, Kosovo
Lăpuşnic, place names in Romania